Parvilucifera is a genus of marine alveolates that parasitise dinoflagellates. Parvilucifera is a parasitic genus described in 1999 by Norén et al. It is classified perkinsozoa in the supraphylum of Alveolates. This taxon serves as a sister taxon to the dinoflagellates and apicomplexans. Thus far, five species have been described in this taxon, which include: P.infectans, P.sinerae, P.corolla, P.rostrata, and P.prorocentri. 
The genus Parvilucifera is morphologically characterized by flagellated zoospore. The life cycle of the species in this genus consist of free-living zoospores, an intracellular stage called trophont, and asexual division to form resting sporangium inside host cell. This taxon has gained more interest in research due to its potential significance in terms of negative regulation for dinoflagellates blooms, that have proved harmful for algal species, humans, and the shellfish industry (Norén et al. 1999).

History

The genus was first described by Noren and Moestrup in 1999 and was isolated off the west coast of Sweden.
The discovery was made through the collection of dinoflagellates Dinophysis on the Swedish West Coast, which were found to contain round bodies that were assumed to be products of sexual reproduction. After preservation in the refrigerator for two weeks, the dinoflagellates had all died but what had remained were the round bodies. These were further found to be sporangia of parasitic protist, later described as Parvilucifera infectans. 
 
Initially, it was assumed that the observed zooids would grow into dinoflagellate cells, and there was much debate that sporangia did not arise from parasites. However, when very similar observations of the round bodies were made with plankton material also from the Swedish West Coast, led to further investigation (Norén et al. 1999). 
Through combined examination of light and electron microscopy alongside DNA sequencing of the emerging sporangia from the zooids displayed a relationship with Perkinsus. Differences of the ultrastructure of zooids arose in terms of the flagellum and were noted in contrast to dinoflagellates and apicomplexans. This led to a designation of a new phylum, Perkinsozoa. This phylum encompasses Perkinsus, Parvilucifera and Psammosa (Norén et al. 1999).

Following the discovery of P.infectans, the next Parviluciferao be discovered was P.sinerae (Figueroa et al. 2008), which is also the closest relative to P.infectans. Then followed the discovery of P.prorocentri (Hoppenrath & Leander 2009), P.rostrata (Karpov & Guillou 2013), and  P.corolla (Reñé et al. 2017).

Parvilucifera can be broken up into 'parvi' which means small and 'lux' which means light. So overall, small light; although also means refractile zooids.

Habitat

The presence of Perkinsozoa has been demonstrated in freshwater, marine waters, and sediments (Reñé et al. 2017). P.infectans has been found in coastal Sweden where it was first discovered, especially being commonly found in marine sediment (Alacid et al. 2015). Nearly all of the species of Parvilucifera have been found to be generalist parasites for dinoflagellates, but increasing studies are allowing a better understanding for the preferences of specific species for particular species of dinoflagellates (Reñé et al. 2016).

Taxonomy

There are five recognised species in this genus. 
The type species is Parvilucifera infectans.
Parvilucifera sinerae
Parvilucifera corolla
Parvilucifera rostrata
Parvilucifera prorocentri

Anatomy

The zoospores are 1.2-1.8 micrometers in diameter and possess two flagellae — an anterior (transverse) one and a shorter posterior one. They also possess alveoli, a refractile body, a mitochondrion with tubular cristae, micronemes, rhoptries and a pseudoconoid. They also have a heteromorphic pair of central microtubules in the anterior axoneme. The micronemes have bulbous posterior ends and are associated with the pseudoconoid.

The size of the mature sporangium seems to have a 1:1 ratio with the size of the host cell. Therefore, if a host cell is smaller the mature sporangium will also be smaller and vice versa if the host cell is larger the sporangium will be larger as well (Garcés et al. 2012). All of the Parvilucifera species have alveoli, flattened vesicles under the plasma membrane, that can be empty or filled with cellulosic material. The free-living zoospores are biflagellated, with a longer anterior flagellum and a short posterior flagellum. Mitochondria have tubular cristae, Golgi with six cisternae and these are micronemes, and rhoptries (secretory organelles). A reduced pseudoconoid (no.of microtubules) and conoid-associated micronemes alongside the rhoptries are considered useful for penetration into the host cell (Lepelletier et al. 2014).  The refractile body in zoospore with two dissimilar flagella and heteromorphic pair of central microtubules in the anterior axoneme (Reñé et al. 2017). There are some characteristics that are found in P. corolla, P.infectans, P.sinerae, and P.rostrata that are not found in P.prorocentri  include a dense globule in the basal body, dense area in the axoneme and a residual body inside the sporangium.

The species P.prorocentri has had a lot of uncertainty around whether or not it has been placed in the correct clade due to its overlap of characteristics with Perkinsids (Hoppenrath & Leander 2009). The following morphological characteristics are found in P.prorocentric species that are not found in other Parvilucifera species: a germ tube, bipartile trichocysts, and syndinean-like nucleus (Reñé et al. 2017). The germ tube is the pathway through which the zoospores are released in P.proroccentri, in contrast to the release through apertures of the operculum such as the other Parvilucifera species (Hoppenrath & Leander 2009).  The release of the zoospores occurring through a germ tube is a characteristic that is shared with the Perkinsus taxa (Reñé et al. 2017). One other difference is that the sporangium wall is found to be smooth in P.prorocentri. In retrospect of all these differing characteristics of P.prorocentri may indicate that it belongs to a different genus, although it is too early to make this claim prior to the lack of discovery of more Parvilucifera species that may also have germ tube release (Reñé et al. 2017).

Life cycle

The overall life cycle of most Parvilucifera consists of an infective stage of free-living zoospores, the intracellular stage: trophont (feeding stage), and a resting sporangium that forms inside the host cell (Alacid et al. 2015). The endoparasites once having infected the cell will degrade the cytoplasmic contents of the host cell, describing the trophont stage. As this the process of feeding continues the contents of the host cell will become entirely degraded or pushed to the outer edges of the cell. As the trophont stage comes to an end, the sporangium should be developing, which will further give rise to numerous zoospores which will eventually be released out of the cell through the operculum of the apertures, unless it is P.prorocentri in which case the zoospores would be released through the germ tube (Reñé et al. 2017).

The zoospores of each of the species of the Parvilucifera are slightly different from each other. The zoospores of P.corolla  are teardrop-shaped, and the zoospores of P.sinerae and P.infectans are described as elongated. Although, the average length approximately 2.9  m and width of the zoospores are similar among P.corolla, P.sinerae, and P.infectans (Rene et al. 2016).  Whereas, the zoospores of P.rostrata which shows a rostrum in the apical region and are larger . As well as, the zoospores of P.prorocentri which are reniform and similar in size to P.rostrata (Reñé et al. 2016).

The mature sporangium of all of the species of Parvilucifera, aside from P.prorocentri, are described as blackish.

A characterizing difference of the P.sinerae species is the process of infection can follow two pathways depending on the host. The pathways can be identified as either cytoplasmic infection or nuclear infection. The preference of pathway is based upon whether the dinoflagellate host cell is thecate or athecate. To be thecate in dinoflagellates means to have an outer layer of cellulose plates that serves as an extra layer of protection, to be athecate means to not have this covering. If the dinoflagellate is thecate, then the pathway of infection will be nuclear; the process will follow with the de-attachment of dinoflagellate theca. If the host cell is athecate, then cytoplasmic infection will proceed which is indicated by the presence of vacuole-like structures in the cytoplasm, and because the nucleus is not infected first the dinoflagellate cell is resilient for longer than the thecate cell. Through experimental studies, for the species P.sinerae salinity may also play a significant role in terms of germabilit, as it was found that lower salinity levels would promote higher infection rates (Figueroa et al. 2008).

P. infectans and P.sinerae have been able to survive extreme conditions due to the resilience of sporangium in the host cells which can protect the zoospores, alongside the protection of the host cyst. The Parvilucifera sporangium has been found to be able to survive cold temperatures for many months (Lepelletier et al. 2013).

Host Range 

As mentioned above, only P.prorocentri is known to have a single host cell, which is Prorocentrum fukuyoi. The other species of Parvilucifera are considered generalist parasites; indicating that they are able to infect a wide range of dinoflagellates. There is further research underway to understand the specific host ranges for each species in order to be able to better apply the discovery of this genus towards the negative regulation of harmful dinoflagellate blooms (Alacid et al. 2015).

Practical Importance

The practical importance of the Parvilucifera has recently become a topic of interest as the genus can be seen to be a controlling factor of many harmful blooms of dinoflagellates (Norén et al.). Dinoflagellate blooms have been regarded as very harmful to the shellfish industry (Norén et al. 1999), as well as, have been noted to produce potent toxins (Alacid et al. 2015).  Some dinoflagellates are also known to create massive faunal mortality and can even be fatal for humans. Therefore, this a worldwide problem that has gained significant importance over the last couple decades (Lepelletier et al. 2013). As we have seen, many Parvilucifera have a widespread dinoflagellate host range, and thus can serve as community regulators (Reñé et al. 2016).

References

Alacid, E., Rene, A., & Garces, E. (2015). New insights into the parasitoid Parvilucifera sinerae life cycle: The development and kinetics of infection of a bloom-forming dinoflagellate host. Protist, 166(6), 677-699. 10.1016/j.protis.2015.09.001

Figueroa, R. I., Garcés, E., Massana, R., & Camp, J. (2008). Description, host-specificity, and strain selectivity of the dinoflagellate parasite Parvilucifera sinerae sp. nov. (Perkinsozoa).Protist, 159(4), 563-578. 10.1016/j.protis.2008.05.003

Garces, E., Alacid, E., Bravo, I., Fraga, S., Figueroa, R(2013). Parvilucifera sinerae (alveolata, myzozoa) is a generalist parasitoid of dinoflagellates. Protist, 164(2), 245-260. 10.1016/j.protis.2012.11.004

Hoppenrath, M., & Leander, B. (2009). Molecular phylogeny of Parvilucifera prorocentri (alveolata, myzozoa): Insights into perkinsid character evolution. Journal of Eukaryotic Microbiology, 56(3), 251-256. 10.1111/j.1550-7408.2009.00395.x

Lepelletier, F., Karpov, S., Le Panse, S., Bigeard, E., Skovgaard, A., Jeanthon, C., & Guillou, L. (2014). Parvilucifera rostrata sp nov (perkinsozoa), a novel parasitoid that infects planktonic dinoflagellates. Protist, 165(1), 31-49. 10.1016/j.protis.2013.09.005

Norén, F., Moestrup, Ø., & Rehnstam-Holm, A. (1999). Parvilucifera infectans Norén et moestrup gen. et sp. nov. (perkinsozoa phylum nov.): A parasitic flagellate capable of killing toxic microalgae. European Journal of Protistology, 35(3), 233-254. 10.1016/S0932-4739(99)80001-7

Rene, A., Alacid, E., Figueroa, R., Rodriguez, F., & Garces, E. (2017). Life-cycle, ultrastructure, and phylogeny of Parvilucifera corolla sp nov (alveolata, perkinsozoa), a parasitoid of dinoflagellates. European Journal of Protistology, 58, 9-25. 10.1016/j.ejop.2016.11.006

External links
 http://tolweb.org/Alveolates/2379

Alveolata genera
Perkinsozoa